Wayne Thornborrow (born 27 December 1972) is a former Australian rules footballer who played with St Kilda in the Australian Football League (AFL).

Thornborrow was initially drafted by St Kilda in the 1989 National Draft, but the Glenelg recruit remained in South Australia and didn't play in the AFL until 1994. He played 13 games for St Kilda, in two seasons, then went to Richmond, which had traded Jamie Elliott for him. Thornborrow returned to Glenelg without playing senior football for Richmond.

References

External links
 
 

1972 births
Australian rules footballers from South Australia
St Kilda Football Club players
Glenelg Football Club players
Living people